Robin C. Ashton is an American government official serving as inspector general of the Central Intelligence Agency.

Education 
Ashton earned a Bachelor of Arts degree from the University of Michigan and a Juris Doctor from the William & Mary Law School.

Career

Department of Justice 
Before joining the CIA, Ashton worked in the Office of Professional Responsibility in the Department of Justice where she served as director from January 2011 to September 2018. She also worked as the principal deputy director of the Executive Office for United States Attorneys.

In 2001, Ashton was identified by The New York Times as having been denied a promotion due to a political dispute. Monica Goodling, White House liaison of the Department of Justice, was reported as having denied Ashton's promotion. Ashton appeared alongside James Comey, then Deputy Attorney General, to testify at a Congressional inquiry into Goodling's behavior as a public servant.

During her DOJ career, Ashton was awarded the Attorney General's Claudia Flynn Award for Professional Responsibility, the Attorney General's Award for Outstanding Leadership in Management, the United States Attorney's Award for Meritorious Service, and the Executive Office for U.S. Attorneys Director's Award for Excellence in Management, among other awards.

Office of the Director of National Intelligence 
Between September 2018 and June 2021 Ashton served as principal deputy inspector general of the Intelligence Community (IGIC), based in the Office of the Director of National Intelligence.

Central Intelligence Agency 
Ashton was nominated to serve as inspector general of the Central Intelligence Agency by President Joe Biden, and confirmed by the U.S. Senate on June 24, 2021, by voice vote.

References

Living people
University of Michigan alumni
Biden administration personnel
Trump administration personnel
United States Department of Justice officials
William & Mary Law School alumni
Year of birth missing (living people)